Finn Lake is a lake in Wadena County, in the U.S. state of Minnesota.

A large share of the early settlers near this lake being natives of Finland caused the name to be selected.

See also
List of lakes in Minnesota

References

Lakes of Minnesota
Lakes of Wadena County, Minnesota